Hell on Earth is the dark paranormal series by Jackie Kessler. 

It focuses on the former succubus Jezebel, now the mortal Jesse Harris, as she tries to avoid her Hellish past and learn how to be truly human. Hell, however, wants Jesse back, which is really putting a crimp on her human life.

Books/Stories in the Hell on Earth series

Hell's Belles (Kensington/Zebra Books, January 2007). The succubus Jezebel runs away from Hell, hides on Earth as an exotic dancer while trying to avoid demonic bounty hunters.

The Road to Hell (Kensington/Zebra Books, November 2007). Former succubus Jezebel, now the mortal Jesse Harris, must return to Hell to save the lives of those she loves. (Love, she learns, is a Hell of a lot harder than lust.)

 When Hell Comes Calling Bound is the Bewitching Lilith anthology (Popcorn Press, est. January 2008). This is the story of how Lillith goes from First Woman to the first mortal demon.

A Hell of a Time, Eternal Lover anthology (Kensington Books, April 2008). Former succubus Jesse Harris and her lover Paul Hamilton take a road trip to the Catskill Mountains and have to fight for Jesse's life and Paul's soul.

Hotter Than Hell (Kensington/Zebra Books, August 2008). The incubus Daunuan, while fighting to become First Prince of Lust, learns about love.

American fantasy novel series
Book series introduced in 2007
Succubi in popular culture